Gage Munroe (born January 4, 1999) is a Canadian actor. He has performed roles on television programs like Stoked, Murdoch Mysteries, Mr Moon, Falling Skies and Alphas, and has appeared in films like the 2008 Canadian drama One Week (directed by Michael McGowan) and the 2011 epic Immortals (alongside Henry Cavill and Mickey Rourke).

Munroe's best known role was as PK in the festival-lauded Canadian action film I Declare War. He is also known for providing the voices of Hank N Stein in Hotel Transylvania: The Series, Justin in the first two seasons of Justin Time, Marshall in the first season of PAW Patrol and for playing Josh Philips in the Christian drama The Shack.

Filmography

References

External links

1999 births
Living people
Canadian male child actors
Canadian male television actors
Canadian male voice actors
Male actors from Toronto
21st-century Canadian male actors